The following is a list of cities administered by the Palestinian National Authority. After the 1995 Interim Agreements, the Palestinian National Authority took control of civil affairs in the West Bank Palestinian enclaves, designated Areas A and B, where most Palestinian population centers are located (and excluding those within the municipal borders of East Jerusalem). Israel Defense Forces are responsible for security in Area B in the West Bank and have full control over localities in Area C.

Following the 2007 rift between the main two Palestinian factions Fatah and Hamas, the Palestinian National Authority has been split with the former dominating the Palestinian government in the West Bank and the latter controlling the Gaza Strip.

Local regulations
The Local Government Ministry of the Palestinian National Authority is responsible for granting a town with city or municipality status. However, there is no specific guidelines for a particular locality to achieve the status of Palestinian city. It is mostly judged on the population reaching above 20,000. The Palestinian Central Bureau of Statistics (PCBS) took its latest official census in 2007.

List of cities
The largest city in the Gaza Strip and all of Palestine is Gaza City, and the largest cities in the West Bank are east Jerusalem and Hebron. Some cities form agglomerations with other towns or cities, such as the Bethlehem metropolitan area with Beit Jala and Beit Sahour. Ramallah and al-Bireh also form an agglomeration and are often considered a single city.

The following is a list of all Palestinian cities under Ramallah-administration, their governorates, their specific jurisdictions and their populations according to the 2007 census and the 2015 estimate by the PCBS.

Mixed cities
 Hebron (الخليل/חברון): Hebron is a city where between 500 and 850 Israelis live among around 210,000 Palestinians.

See also
Arab localities in Israel
List of cities in the Gaza Strip
List of cities in Israel
List of Israeli settlements with city status in the West Bank
Municipality (Palestinian Authority)
Village council (Palestinian Authority)
Palestinian refugee camps

References

Administered by the State of Palestine
Palestine
Politics of the Palestinian National Authority
Palestine

State of Palestine geography-related lists